Mirko Spada (born 26 January 1969) is a retired male decathlete from Switzerland. He set his personal best (7984 points) in the men's decathlon on 2 July 1995 in Helmond, Netherlands. Spada is a two-time national champion in the men's decathlon: 1993 and 1994.

Achievements

References
 

1969 births
Living people
Swiss decathletes